Christina Hembo (born 1978) is a Danish Jewelry and watch designer and entrepreneur, who owns the company CHRISTINA Design London and formerly owned the Danish cycling team Christina Watches–Dana. She designs high quality Jewelry and Watches at affordable prices. 

Christina Hembo has a master's degree from the University of the Arts London.

She participated in Vild med Dans 2010, the Danish version of Dancing with the Stars.

References 

1978 births
Living people
Danish designers